The Woodentops are a British rock band that enjoyed critical acclaim and moderate popularity in the mid-1980s.

History
The band formed in 1983 in South London with an initial lineup of Rolo McGinty (vocals, guitar, formerly of the Wild Swans and the Jazz Butcher), Simon Mawby (guitar), Alice Thompson (keyboards), Frank DeFreitas (bass guitar) and Benny Staples replacing Paul Hookham (drums).

After a debut single, "Plenty" on Food Records in 1984, which received a glowing review from Morrissey in Melody Maker, they signed to the independent label Rough Trade Records, releasing a series of singles in 1985 and their debut album Giant in 1986. Generally well-received by critics, the album's sound was characterised by acoustic guitars, but also featured accordion, marimba, strings and trumpet sounds. The album reached No. 35 on the UK Albums Chart. A single from the album, "Good Thing", reached No. 7 on the UK Indie Chart.

The band then became more experimental and frenetic when playing live, using more electronic sounds. This is documented on the live album Live Hypno Beat (1987), recorded in Los Angeles in 1986. The band also started to become rawer and more unpredictable live, becoming one of the most exciting independent groups from the UK, while gaining an early hit on the burgeoning club scene in Ibiza with "Why."

In 1987, Thompson left to be replaced by Anne Stephenson of the Communards. The more experimental mood continued on the second album Wooden Foot Cops on the Highway, released the following year. The song "Stop This Car" was voted No. 15 out of 106 in the KROQ Top 106.7 Countdown of 1988, outperforming many more established acts. Another of the album's standout tracks, "Wheels Turning," became a dancefloor favourite.

The Woodentops continued to play live, touring the world until 1992, and tracks such as "Tainted World" became a regular on New York radio station Kiss FM with DJ Tony Humphries.

Vocalist and guitarist Rolo McGinty, who also wrote all of the Woodentops' songs, resurfaced with the DJ band Pluto in the 1990s and the Dogs Deluxe electronica project, and also provided vocals for Gary Lucas's Gods and Monsters. Guitarist Simon Mawby was briefly a member of the House of Love in the early 1990s.

The Woodentops returned to live performances in September 2006. In October 2009, they performed in a special concert at the Queen Elizabeth Hall in London's South Bank. There, they also curated an exhibition of works by artist Panni Bharti and concerts by musicians Worm, Othon and Ernesto Tomasini. In 2010, the band announced their first single in 20 years and played a string of dates across Europe. 

Present lineup
 Rolo McGinty - vocals, guitar
 Simon Mawby - guitar
 Aine O'Keeffe - keyboards
 Frank de Freitas - bass guitar
 Paul Ashby - drums

Discography

Albums

Studio albums

Mini albums

Live albums

Compilation albums

Video albums

Singles

References

External links
 

English alternative rock groups
English indie rock groups
Musical groups established in 1983
Musical groups from London
Rough Trade Records artists
Columbia Records artists
Epic Records artists